is the remains of a castle structure in Yatsushiro, Kumamoto Prefecture, Japan.

In 1619, Mugishima Castle collapsed due to a large earthquake then Katō Kiyomasa's son Kato Tadahiro ordered his vassal Katō Masataka to built a new castle. In 1632, Hosokawa Tadaoki entered the castle by the Tokugawa shogunate's order and spent retired life in the kitanomaru compound of the castle.
 
The castle is now only ruins, just some remnants of water moats and stone walls. Yatsushiro Castle was registered as a National Historic Site in 2014 as 
one of the Remains of Yatsushiro Castles, combining both Furufumoto Castle and Mugishima Castle. Yatsushiro castle was listed as one of the Continued Top 100 Japanese Castles in 2017.

Gallery

See also
List of Historic Sites of Japan (Kumamoto)

Literature

References

Castles in Kumamoto Prefecture
Historic Sites of Japan
Former castles in Japan